Valeira Dam is a concrete gravity dam on the Douro, where the river forms the border line between the districts of Viseu and Bragança. It is located in the municipality São João da Pesqueira, in Viseu District, Portugal.

Construction of the dam began in 1971. The dam was completed in 1975. It is owned by Companhia Portuguesa de Produção de Electricidade (CPPE).

Dam
Valeira Dam is a 48 m tall (height above foundation) and 380 m long gravity dam with a crest altitude of 113 m. The volume of the dam is 220,000 m³. The spillway with 5 radial gates is part of the dam body (maximum discharge 18,000 m³/s).

Reservoir
At full reservoir level of 105 m the reservoir of the dam has a surface area of 7.95 km² and a total capacity of 97 mio. m³. The active capacity is 8 (12, 13 or 13,04) mio. m³.

Power plant 

The run-of-the-river hydroelectric power plant was commissioned in 1976 (1975). It is operated by EDP. The plant has a nameplate capacity of 240 (216) MW. Its average annual generation is 610.7 (663, 748 or 801) GWh.

The power station contains 3 Kaplan turbine-generators with 82.4 (72) MW (80 MVA) each in a dam powerhouse located on the right side of the dam. The turbine rotation is 115.4 rpm. The minimum hydraulic head is 15.5 m, the maximum 31.5 m. Maximum flow per turbine is 360 m³/s.

The turbines were provided by Kværner, the generators by Brown, Boveri & Cie.

Lock
On the left side of the dam is a lock, which can handle ships with the following maximum properties: 83 m in length, 11.40 m on the beam, 3.8 m load-draught and a cargo capacity of 2500 tons.

See also

 List of power stations in Portugal
 List of dams and reservoirs in Portugal

References

Dams in Portugal
Hydroelectric power stations in Portugal
Gravity dams
Dams completed in 1975
Energy infrastructure completed in 1975
1975 establishments in Portugal
Buildings and structures in Viseu District
Dams on the Douro River
Locks of Portugal
Run-of-the-river power stations